Guy Sénac (13 March 1932 – 13 January 2019) was a French football defender that played on the Lique 1 from Villetaneuse. He is the father of Didier Sénac. Guy was selected twice for the French team.

Biography 
Guy Sénac was born on March 13, 1932, in Villetaneuse. He would join Racing Club de Paris in 1952. Guy was part of the 1962 World Cup qualifiers. During the game Sénac scored a goal by "heading the ball back into the heart of the Bulgarian area after a corner kicked back." Over his career he would score 42 top-flight goals and play 347 games. In 1963 he would leave Racing Clube de Paris to join RC Lens. Sénac died on Sunday, January 13, 2019, and was buried in Avenue Van Pelt in Lens.

Games 

 Racing Club de France (1961-1962)
 Racing Club de France (1962-1963)
 RC Lens (1963-1964)
 RC Lens (1964-1965)
 RC Lens (1965-1966)
 RC Lens (1966-1967)
 RC Lens (1967-1968)
 World Cup Qualifiers (December 11, 1962)
 RC Lens France (July 1963 - June, 1968)
 Racing Club de France Racing Club de France France (July 1952 - June 1963)
 Qualifier CM Europe
 Matchs amicals

References

1932 births
2019 deaths
French footballers
France international footballers
Racing Club de France Football players
RC Lens players
Ligue 1 players
Association football defenders